Machairoceratops (meaning "bent sword horned face"), previously known as the "Wahweap centrosaurine B", is an extinct genus of centrosaurine ceratopsian dinosaur known from the Late Cretaceous Wahweap Formation (late Campanian stage) of Grand Staircase–Escalante National Monument, southern Utah, United States.

Discovery
 
It contains a single species, M. cronusi, first described and named in 2016 by Eric K. Lund, Patrick M. O’Connor, Mark A. Loewen and Zubair A. Jinnah. The generic name is derived from Greek machairis, meaning "bent sword", in reference to its unique frill ornamentation showing two forward curving horns on the frill's uppermost part, and Latinized Greek ceratops, meaning "horned-face", which is a common suffix for ceratopsian genera names. The specific name cronusi refers to Cronus, a Greek god who deposed his father Uranus by castrating him with a sickle or scythe based on the mythology, and as such is shown carrying a curved bladed weapon. Machairoceratops is known solely from the holotype UMNH VP 20550, found in 2006, which is housed at the Natural History Museum of Utah. It is represented by a partial skull including two curved and elongate eyesocket horncores, the left jugal bone, a nearly complete but slightly deformed braincase, the left squamosal bone, and a parietal bone complex and its unique horn ornamentation, all collected in association.

Phylogeny

Lund et al. (2016) tested the position of Machairoceratops within Centrosaurinae by performing maximum parsimony and Bayesian phylogenetic species level analyses. The maximum parsimony analysis yielded a large polytomy at the base of Centrosaurinae, with only Centrosaurini, most of Pachyrhinosaurini (Einiosaurus, Wendiceratops and Pachyrostra), and a clade formed by Avaceratops and Nasutoceratops being resolved. The Bayesian analysis yielded a fully resolved topology which is shown below.

The cladogram presented below follows a more recent phylogenetic analysis by Chiba et al. (2017):

See also
 Timeline of ceratopsian research
2016 in paleontology

References

Centrosaurines
Dinosaurs of North America
Fossil taxa described in 2016
Paleontology in Utah
Ornithischian genera